Social Democratic Youth is the youth branch of the Social Democratic Alliance of Iceland.

References 

2000 establishments in Iceland
Youth wings of political parties in Iceland
Youth wings of social democratic parties
Social Democratic Alliance